"Always Be" is a song by Australian R&B band Kulcha. It was released in April 1997 as the second single from the band's second studio album Take Your Time. The song peaked at number 25 in Australia and 34 in New Zealand.

Track listing

CD single
 "Always Be" - 4:17
 "Feel the Funk" - 3:25
 "Always Be" (instrumental) - 4:16

Charts

References

1997 songs
1997 singles
Kulcha (band) songs
Dance-pop songs
East West Records singles